Frederick Akuffo Owusu (born 23 September 1936) is a Ghanaian sprinter. He competed in the men's 4 × 400 metres relay at the 1960 Summer Olympics.

References

1936 births
Living people
Athletes (track and field) at the 1960 Summer Olympics
Ghanaian male sprinters
Ghanaian male middle-distance runners
Olympic athletes of Ghana
Athletes (track and field) at the 1958 British Empire and Commonwealth Games
Athletes (track and field) at the 1962 British Empire and Commonwealth Games
Commonwealth Games bronze medallists for Ghana
Commonwealth Games medallists in athletics
Place of birth missing (living people)
Medallists at the 1962 British Empire and Commonwealth Games